The Ministry of the Interior ( or MINGOB) is a government ministry of Guatemala, headquartered in Zone 1 of Guatemala City.

Agencies
Dirección General del Sistema Penitenciario de Guatemala - Prison system
Policía Nacional Civil (Guatemala) (ES)
Bomberos Voluntarios (Guatemala) (ES)

Notes

External links
 Ministry of the Interior 
Government of Guatemala
Internal affairs ministries